Graziosa Maggi (10 June 1925 – 15 September 2022), better known as Diana Maggi, was an Italian-born Argentine film, television, radio, and stage actress who was known for starring in the 1950 film Campeón a la fuerza.

Maggi was born in Milan on 10 June 1925. She married actor Juan Carlos Dual, after meeting him at rehearsals for a play. The couple lived together from 1976 until Dual's death in 2015. Maggi died on 15 September 2022, at the age of 97.

Filmography

 1938: Mujeres que trabajan as an extra
 1943: Frontera Sur
 1943: Las sorpresas del divorcio
 1948: La calle grita
 1949: Alma de bohemio
 1949: De padre desconocido
 1949: La doctora quiere tangos
 1950: Campeón a la fuerza
 1950: El morocho del Abasto (La vida de Carlos Gardel)
 1950: El otro yo de Marcela
 1950: Fuego sagrado
 1950: Nacha Regules
 1951: Concierto de bastón
 1951: El complejo de Felipe
 1951: The Fan
 1952: Ésta es mi vida
 1952: Mi noche triste
 1952: Sala de guardia
 1953: La Tigra
 1953: La voz de mi ciudad
 1953: Una ventana a la vida
 1955: La delatora
 1957: La sombra de Safo
 1964: Placeres conyugales or Las Mujeres los prefieren tontos
 1965: Nadie oyó gritar a Cecilio Fuentes
 1965: Viaje de una noche de verano
 1966: Hotel alojamiento
 1969: ¡Qué noche de casamiento!
 1970: El extraño del pelo largo
 1971: Vuelvo a vivir...vuelvo a cantar
 1975: La película
 1982: Esto es vida (unreleased)

References

External links
 
 

1925 births
2022 deaths
20th-century Argentine actresses
20th-century Italian actresses
Argentine film actresses
Italian emigrants to Argentina
Italian film actresses
Actresses from Milan